Osman Özköylü (born 26 August 1971 in Aydın) is a Turkish football coach and former player.

He played for Aydınspor (1990–1993), Trabzonspor (1993–2002), Samsunspor (2002–2004), Kayserispor (2004), Kocaelispor (2004–2005), Etimesgut Şekerspor (2005–2006) and Uşakspor (2006–2007). He played for Turkey national football team 13 times and was a participant at the 2000 UEFA European Championship.

Managerial statistics

Honours

Player honours

 Turkish Cup 1995
 Turkish Super Cup 1995
 Chancellor Cup 1994, 1996
  Turkey
 UEFA Euro 2000 Quarter-Finalist

Managerial honours

Elazığspor
TFF Second League: 2010-2011 Winners

Kayseri Erciyesspor
TFF First League: 2012-2013 Winners

References

External links

 (as coach)

1971 births
Living people
People from Aydın
Turkish footballers
Trabzonspor footballers
Samsunspor footballers
Kocaelispor footballers
Uşakspor footballers
Turkey international footballers
UEFA Euro 2000 players
Turkish football managers
Denizlispor managers
Kayseri Erciyesspor managers
Süper Lig managers
Association football defenders